Karadut is a village in the Kâhta District, Adıyaman Province, Turkey. The village is populated by Kurds of the Mirdêsî tribe and had a population of 781 in 2021.

The hamlets of Derince, Onevler, Sarısu, Şahintepe and Şirinevler are attached to the village.

References

Villages in Kâhta District
Kurdish settlements in Adıyaman Province